Stagg High School may refer to:
Amos Alonzo Stagg High School (Palos Hills, Illinois)
Stagg High School (Stockton, California)